Heme O (or haem O) differs from the closely related heme A by having a methyl group at ring position 8 instead of the formyl group. The isoprenoid chain at position 2 is the same.

Heme O, found in the bacterium Escherichia coli, functions in a similar manner to heme A in mammalian oxygen reduction.

See also
 Heme

References 

Tetrapyrroles
Biomolecules